The Burge House is a historic house located in Houston, Texas, United States. It was listed on the National Register of Historic Places on June 22, 1983. It is in the Houston Heights neighborhood, one of the first planned suburbs in Texas.

Description and history 
It has a hip roof with small central dormers and projecting gables on the sides. The attached porch wraps around one side and is supported by half columns set on brick piers. The porch has rails and balusters between the piers and leads to brick steps to ground level. The gable end over the entry is ornamented. The front door has side lights and a transom, and is flanked symmetrically by two windows. The second floor has shingle walls and two pair of symmetrically set double hung sash windows. The house is considered a good example the transition in architectural style from Victorian influenced Colonial Revival architecture to a more 21st century style with bungaloid elements.

On May 21, 1998, the Houston Archeological and Historical Commission found the house met the criteria for designation as a Landmark of the City of Houston. In 2010 it appeared on a list of designated City of Houston Landmarks. Greenwood Properties announced they purchased the property in 2000 for a residential realty office. In 2006 the house was featured in the Houston Heights Association's "Dickens in the Heights Home Tour and Holiday Market".

See also
 Historic preservation
 National Register of Historic Places listings in Harris County, Texas

References

External links
 
 
 

Houses in Houston
Houses on the National Register of Historic Places in Texas
National Register of Historic Places in Houston